Ernest Hamlin Baker (1889-1975) was an American artist and illustrator from Poughkeepsie, New York. He illustrated more than 300 covers for Time magazine. He also made posters for the American Legion. He drew political cartoons for Poughkeepsie's Evening Star newspaper. His work was part of the painting event in the art competition at the 1932 Summer Olympics.

He graduated from Colgate University.

References

External links
 Examples of Baker's magazine covers
 Pettaquamscutt Historical Society Mural – Kingston RI at Living New Deal

American illustrators
1889 births
1975 deaths
Magazine illustrators
Section of Painting and Sculpture artists
Olympic competitors in art competitions